Edward Joseph Leehane (2 June 1923 – 18 November 2014) was an Australian rules footballer who played in the Victorian Football League (VFL).

He was a member of the Essendon premiership teams in 1942, 1949 and 1950.

Leehane later captain-coached Mansfield from 1951 to 1956.

References

External links

Essendon Football Club players
Essendon Football Club Premiership players
Mansfield Football Club players
Australian rules footballers from Melbourne
1923 births
2014 deaths
Three-time VFL/AFL Premiership players
People from Brunswick, Victoria
Australian rules football coaches